The American Association of Immunologists Lifetime Achievement Award is the highest honor bestowed by the American Association of Immunologists (AAI). It has been awarded annually to a single AAI member since 1994.

Winners

Source:

See also
 List of medicine awards

References

Immunology
Medicine awards
American science and technology awards
Awards by scientific societies